Dinosaurs Attack! is a trading card series by Topps released in 1988 and containing 55 base cards and 11 sticker cards. The cards tell the story of dinosaurs transported through time into the present day through a freak accident and wreaking havoc on Earth. The series is notable for its graphic violence and gore, intended to evoke memories of the successful Mars Attacks trading card series of 1962.

Overview 
The Dinosaurs Attack! trading cards were created as a follow-up to the successful trading card series Mars Attacks. Like Mars Attacks, Dinosaurs Attack! was intended as a homage and a parody of 1950s B-movies. While Mars Attacks was a parody of alien invasion movies, Dinosaurs Attack! was inspired by monster-on-the-loose movies such as The Beast from 20,000 Fathoms and Godzilla.

Topps veteran product developers Art Spiegelman, Len Brown (who had designed and written Mars Attacks) and Gary Gerani developed the idea for the series.  It was Gerani's original suggestion, and he receives a single "created by" credit in later Topps-licensed comic books and graphic novels based on the property.  Gerani sketched out the 55-card storyboards, wrote the copy for the card backs, and art directed all the cards. Herb Trimpe adapted Gerani's storyboards into pencils, with some assistance from John Nemec and George Evans.  Then, Earl Norem and XNO delivered the final paintings. Paul Mavrides and Harry S. Robins of the Church of the SubGenius did the artwork for the 11 stickers.

The storyline of the card series is minimal. They tell the story of a scientific time travel experiment gone horribly wrong, transporting several dinosaurs, pterosaurs, marine reptiles and other prehistoric animals of many kinds from their various prehistoric time periods into modern times, where they wreak havoc upon mankind. Most of the cards show a different scene of the dinosaurs causing chaos and death across the world. Some of the cards show the scientists frantically working to reverse the time travel effect. In the end, the Supreme Monstrosity, the patron deity of the dinosaurs (nicknamed "Dinosaur Satan" by some fans due to its resemblance to the popular culture depiction of Satan) intervenes, trying to stop the scientists.  The lead scientist, Elias Thorne, sacrifices himself to the Supreme Monstrosity so his wife, Helen, can succeed and send the dinosaurs back to their own time, tearing the animals apart in the process.

The artwork is intended to be shocking and graphically bloody, with one card showing schoolchildren being eaten by an Allosaurus, a Stegosaurus devouring a police officer while its spiked tail gouges out the eye of another and a Pteranodon tearing apart the President of the United States. The cards also contain gross inaccuracies in their depiction of dinosaurs; for instance, in one card, trilobites are portrayed as "flesh-eating worms" that attack humans. In reality, trilobites consumed mud for nutrients. Also, a Dimetrodon is depicted as dwarfing St. Basil's Cathedral, several herbivores are depicted as flesh-eaters and other various dinosaurs are depicted as being almost kaiju-like. In fact, one can see references to the films Gorgo and Reptilicus, and two science-fictional dinosaurs, the Rhedosaurus and the Paleosaurus, are among the depicted creatures. Trachodon is the exception; it is correctly portrayed as a plant-eater and is never seen directly causing any deaths (it does, however, indirectly cause death when startling one man on a hunting trip so badly that he shoots another by accident). Additionally, it is the only one on the 11 stickers shown not killing a human (instead, it is trying to eat a streetlight).

Despite the company's hopes, Dinosaurs Attack! did not achieve commercial success. Tim Burton was planning on making a film version but dismissed it when Jurassic Park was released. Instead, he made the film Mars Attacks!

In 2016, Topps and Kickstarter released Mars Attacks: Occupation, an all-new trading card series that contained six different subsets.  One of these was a nine card subset titled Mars Attacks vs. Dinosaurs Attack!.  This is the first time that the two famous trading card series' storylines have been combined.

In 2019, the collectible cards were discussed on two episodes of the popular podcast Hello Internet by hosts CGP Grey and Dr. Brady Haran.

Comic book adaptation 

In 1991 Eclipse Comics began releasing a three-part miniseries based on the cards.  However, due to the poor performance of both the comics and the trading cards they ended up only releasing the first issue. The comic book also included four Dinosaurs Attack! bonus cards that had never been seen before and have not been reprinted since.

In July 2013, IDW Publishing reprinted the one issue of the Eclipse comic and finished the story as part of the series' 25th anniversary. While the original series was only meant to be three issues, IDW expanded the project into a five-part miniseries. In February 2014, the entire miniseries was reprinted as a trade paperback. The miniseries reunited writer Gary Gerani, penciler Herb Trimpe and painter Earl Norem from the original trading card series.

Characters 
Throughout the cards, a small number of recurring characters were present, usually appearing as a name or a picture on a few of the cards.

 Elias Thorne - One of the head scientists on the TimeScanner project, he and his wife Helen were (presumably) the last humans on the space station Prometheus.  While attempting to reverse the TimeScanner's ability to materialize dinosaurs on Earth, they were attacked by a large 'demon' dinosaur.  Thorne sacrificed himself to the beast, giving his wife time to start the reverse on the Timescanner, sucking the dinosaurs back to where they came from and ripping them to pieces as they go.
 Helen Thorne - The wife of Elias Thorne, she helped him build a mechanism to reverse the TimeScanner's effects.  However, a large demon-like dinosaur attacked and killed Elias.  Helen was able to throw the switch to the mechanism, triggering the reversal of the TimeScanner, sucking the dinosaurs back to the past and killing them.  Helen narrates the back of the final story card, telling that how she and Elias only wanted to know what killed the dinosaurs.  She concludes that the reason the dinosaurs were wiped out was because of us.
 The Anchorman - This unnamed anchorman appeared on the back of several cards, interviewing attack survivors.  He first appeared interviewing a group of rock stars who were attacked by a group of dinosaurs who ate their colorful hair.  He later interviewed a man who accidentally shot his friend while fishing, after being startled by a grazing Trachodon.  The anchorman is later killed on another card when a dinosaur invades the newsroom and eats him, while his assistant runs off.  Throughout his first appearances, the anchorman seemed skeptical of the events.
 Mitchell Stevens - The Lt. Colonel in the U.S. Army, he is never actually seen on any of the cards.  Rather, he appears on the back of all the cards that look like a report being addressed to the military, with Stevens being the sender.
 General Frank Manchester - General Frank Manchester was put in charge of U.S. Army operations after the death of the previous commander, who is ripped in two by a pair of dinosaurs (according to the front of the card in which Manchester first appears).  While Manchester is only mentioned on the back of one card, he is later seen on another card crushed by a theropod, his entrails strewn on the ground around him.  It is affirmed this is him by Mitchell Stevens' report on the other side of the card.
 The Saurian - An evolved, benevolent dinosauroid who appears to Elias in a dream. Despite appearing only once, the Saurian is an important character in the cards; he explains that the dinosaurs' god is the one whom Elias saw through the TimeScan three weeks before and that the deity will not rest until the dinosaurs have flooded over into the present. The Saurian further elaborates that human beings possess souls—the ability to judge what is right and wrong—while the dinosaurs do not. This is the cause of the dinosaurs' ferocious, mindless savagery.
 The Supreme Monstrosity - The patron deity of the dinosaurs and the main antagonist. He is a devil-like dinosaur who was brought through the TimeScan by Elias and Helen, after which he then decided that the dinosaurs should rule the present and set them on the human race. He was eventually killed when Elias sacrificed himself so Helen could reverse the TimeScan to kill both him and the dinosaurs.

References

External links
 Bob Heffner's site (illustrated database of the series)
 Background information on the series from The Wrapper magazine
 Gallery

Trading cards
Topps
Products introduced in 1988
Kaiju
Dinosaurs in comic books